Jacole Turner (born May 13, 1994) is an American soccer player who plays as a goalkeeper for Gorilla Elite FC in the UPSL (United Premier Soccer League).

Career

College and amateur
Turner was with Sporting Kansas City's youth team in 2012, before trialling with Dinamo Zagreb and later with Atlético Madrid, whom he signed with on December 28, 2012. Turner was placed with Atlético Madrid C, where he spent 2013, before being released.

Turner signed with USL club Arizona United on April 10, 2014. He was released from the club on June 1, 2015.

Later in 2015, Turner joined Phoenix-based Gorilla Elite FC, an amateur team competing in the newly formed UPSL Arizona Conference. He was announced as team captain before the start of the winter season.

References

1994 births
Living people
American soccer players
Atlético Madrid C players
Soccer players from Missouri
USL Championship players
Association football goalkeepers